Scott Coker (born October 3, 1962) is an American mixed martial artist, Taekwondoin, former movie stuntman, and combat sports promoter. He is the founder and former CEO of MMA promotion Strikeforce and the current President of Bellator MMA.

Background
Scott Coker was born in Seoul in 1962. His father, an American from Tennessee, had arrived in Korea shortly after the Korean War. He met Scott's mother, a Korean, while she was singing at a USO club. They married in  December 1959. When he was approximately 9 years old, Scott and his family relocated to the United States, where they settled in San Jose, California in 1973.

Coker is an Ernie Reyes protégé and full-contact fight promoter covering Kickboxing, K-1, and MMA. Coker has obtained an 8th degree black belt in Taekwondo under Reyes and was an original member of the West Coast Demonstration Team.  In 1986, Scott Coker became one of the  first directors of ISKA.

Mixed martial arts

Strikeforce
Coker founded Strikeforce in 1985 as a kickboxing organization.

The promotion held its first MMA event, Strikeforce: Shamrock vs. Gracie, on March 10, 2006, at the HP Pavilion in San Jose, California. Over the next five years, Coker built the brand into the number two mixed martial arts promotion in the United States, partnering with both Showtime and CBS to televise their events. Strikeforce co-promoted some events with Elite Xtreme Combat, or EliteXC.

In March 2011, Strikeforce was purchased by Zuffa, LLC.  Coker was retained by the company for a contractual period of three years, ending in April 2014.

Bellator MMA
On June 18, 2014, Coker was announced as the new President of Bellator MMA, replacing founder and CEO Bjorn Rebney. Coker was brought in to make 
it a less tournament-focused promotion.

Awards
Combat Press
2015 Executive of the Year

Film career
Coker has participated in various martial arts movies as a fighter, including Dragon Fight, The Last Dragon, and Surf Ninjas.

References

External links
Short Bio
Short Bio

Scott Coker & Strikeforce

1962 births
Living people
American male taekwondo practitioners
American people of Korean descent
Bellator MMA
Kickboxing executives
Mixed martial arts executives
Strikeforce (mixed martial arts)